Henry George Sandon, MBE (born 4 August 1928) is an English antique expert, television personality, author and lecturer specialising in ceramics and is a notable authority on Royal Worcester porcelain. He was curator of the Dyson Perrins Museum for many years.

Personal life
Born in the East End of London, Sandon was evacuated to Buckinghamshire during the Second World War and finished his schooling at the Royal Grammar School, High Wycombe. He then studied at the Guildhall School of Music and became a singer and music teacher at the Royal Grammar School Worcester and a lay clerk in the Worcester Cathedral Choir. He is the father of ceramics and glass expert John Sandon, who is also a well-known television personality.

Career

He began his career as an archaeologist and his knowledge covers pottery and porcelain of all periods and countries. One of his projects was an excavation at the Royal Worcester factory site. He was appointed the curator of the Dyson Perrins Museum at the Royal Worcester Factory in 1966 and held that position until 1982. He has made appearances on the BBC television programme Antiques Roadshow. He has written books on the subject of Worcester and other porcelains, and also lectures on the subject.

Honours
In 2000, he was voted Antiques Personality of the Year by the readers of BBC's Homes & Antiques magazine. He was appointed Member of the Order of the British Empire (MBE) in the 2008 Queen's Birthday Honours for his services to broadcasting, the ceramics industry, and to charity.

The Henry Sandon Hall at the Royal Porcelain works in Worcester is named in his honour. He opened the centre for the arts in 2018.

Selected publications
 1969: The Illustrated Guide to Worcester Porcelain 1751 - 1793. New York: Praeger
 1973: Royal Worcester Porcelain 1862 to the Present Day. London, Barrie and Jenkins; New York: Clarkson N. Potter (2nd ed. 1975; 3rd ed. 1978)

References

External links
Info on Sandon
Publications by Henry Sandon: bibliography

1928 births
Living people
Antiques experts
Members of the Order of the British Empire
People educated at the Royal Grammar School, High Wycombe
Alumni of the Guildhall School of Music and Drama